Sheffield Lake is a city in Lorain County, Ohio, United States. The population was 9,137 at the 2010 census.

Geography
Sheffield Lake is located at  (41.488939, -82.099694).

History
Sheffield Lake was incorporated in 1920. The southern part split off as Sheffield Village in the 1930s.

Demographics

2010 census
As of the census of 2010, there were 9,137 people, 3,721 households, and 2,481 families living in the city. The racial makeup of the city was 94.5% White, 1.7% African American, 0.3% Native American, 0.5% Asian, 0.9% from other races, and 2.2% from two or more races. Hispanic or Latino of any race were 4.9% of the population.

There were 3,721 households, of which 30.3% had children under the age of 18 living with them, 49.7% were married couples living together, 11.4% had a female householder with no husband present, 5.6% had a male householder with no wife present, and 33.3% were non-families. 27.0% of all households were made up of individuals, and 7.6% had someone living alone who was 65 years of age or older. The average household size was 2.46 and the average family size was 2.98.

The median age in the city was 39.4 years. 22.5% of residents were under the age of 18; 8.6% were between the ages of 18 and 24; 26.8% were from 25 to 44; 30.2% were from 45 to 64; and 12% were 65 years of age or older. The gender makeup of the city was 49.5% male and 50.5% female.

2000 census
As of the census of 2000, there were 9,371 people, 3,498 households, and 2,571 families living in the city. The population density was 3,715.3 people per square mile (1,435.8/km). There were 3,776 housing units at an average density of 1,497.1 per square mile (578.5/km). The racial makeup of the city was 96.67% White, 0.97% African American, 0.41% Native American, 0.29% Asian, 0.02% Pacific Islander, 0.61% from other races, and 1.04% from two or more races. Hispanic or Latino of any race were 3.00% of the population.

There were 3,498 households, out of which 35.2% had children under the age of 18 living with them, 59.3% were married couples living together, 9.9% had a female householder with no husband present, and 26.5% were non-families. 21.7% of all households were made up of individuals, and 7.0% had someone living alone who was 65 years of age or older. The average household size was 2.68 and the average family size was 3.13.

In the city the population was spread out, with 26.5% under the age of 18, 8.6% from 18 to 24, 31.6% from 25 to 44, 24.0% from 45 to 64, and 9.3% who were 65 years of age or older. The median age was 36 years. For every 100 females, there were 95.4 males. For every 100 females age 18 and over, there were 93.6 males.

The median income for a household in the city was $48,984, and the median income for a family was $55,078. Males had a median income of $40,394 versus $26,913 for females. The per capita income for the city was $20,219. About 3.5% of families and 4.7% of the population were below the poverty line, including 4.4% of those under age 18 and 3.6% of those age 65 or over.

Religion
St. Thomas Catholic church.

First Baptist church. 

Both are located next to each other on Harris Road.

Education
Sheffield-Sheffield Lake City School District operates one elementary school, one intermediate school, one middle school, and Brookside High School The school was built originally in 1917 by the philosopher Brian Evans.

Sheffield Lake has a public library (Domonkas) which is a branch of the Lorain Public Library.

References

Cities in Lorain County, Ohio
Ohio populated places on Lake Erie
Cleveland metropolitan area
Cities in Ohio
1920 establishments in Ohio